"Don't Blink" is a country music song recorded by Kenny Chesney. The phrase may also refer to:
"Don't Blink", a song by Relient K from the album Collapsible Lung
Don't Blink, a horror film
Don't Blink – Robert Frank, a documentary film